
Nysa County is a unit of territorial administration and local government (powiat) in Opole Voivodeship, south-western Poland, on the Czech border. It came into being on January 1, 1999, as a result of the Polish local government reforms passed in 1998.

As of 2019 its total population is 136,393. The most populated towns are Nysa with 43,849 inhabitants, Głuchołazy with 13,534 inhabitants, and Paczków with 7,460 inhabitants.

Neighbouring counties
Nysa County is bordered by Ząbkowice Śląskie County to the west, Strzelin County and Brzeg County to the north, Opole County to the north-east, and Prudnik County to the south-east. It also borders the Czech Republic to the south-west.

Administrative division
The county is subdivided into nine gminas (five urban-rural and four rural). These are listed in the following table, in descending order of population.

References

 
Nysa